Camarotoechia contracta is a species of brachiopod from the Late Devonian. This articulate brachiopod was discovered in North America, in Warren, Pennsylvania, in strata that is a part of  the Chemung Group. This specimen is also recorded in the United States Synopsis of American Fossil Brachiopoda by Charles Schuchert which was printed in 1897.

Currently, a Camarotoechia contracta fossil can be found in the Yale Peabody Museum of Natural History in New Haven, Connecticut.

References 

Rhynchonellida